1323 Tugela, provisional designation , is a dark background asteroid from the outer regions of the asteroid belt, approximately 60 kilometers in diameter. It was discovered on 19 May 1934, by South African astronomer Cyril Jackson at the Union Observatory in Johannesburg. The asteroid was named for the Tugela River in western South Africa.

Orbit and classification 

Tugela is a non-family asteroid from the main belt's background population. It orbits the Sun in the outer main-belt at a distance of 2.8–3.7 AU once every 5 years and 10 months (2,121 days; semi-major axis of 3.23 AU). Its orbit has an eccentricity of 0.15 and an inclination of 19° with respect to the ecliptic.

Physical characteristics 

In the SMASS classification, Tugela is an Xc-subtype that transitions from the X-type to the carbonaceous C-type asteroids. The Wide-field Infrared Survey Explorer (WISE) characterized it as a primitive P-type asteroid, while the Collaborative Asteroid Lightcurve Link (CALL) assumes it to be a C-type.

Rotation period 

Observations performed by American astronomer Brian Warner at the Palmer Divide Observatory in Colorado Springs, Colorado, during February 2007 produced a lightcurve with a period of 19.50 ± 0.02 hours and an amplitude of 0.25 ± 0.02 in magnitude. In September 2011, photometry in the S-band at the Palomar Transient Factory gave a similar period of 19.777 hours with a brightness variation of 0.18 magnitude.

Diameter and albedo 

According to the surveys carried out by the Infrared Astronomical Satellite IRAS, the Japanese Akari satellite and the NEOWISE mission of NASA's WISE telescope, Tugela measures between 58.44 and 110.11 kilometers in diameter and its surface has an albedo between 0.018 and 0.0567.

CALL largely agrees with IRAS and derives an albedo of 0.0620 with a diameter of 58.50 kilometers based on an absolute magnitude of 9.8.

Naming 

This minor planet was named after the Tugela River, the largest river in the KwaZulu-Natal Province of western South Africa. The official naming citation was mentioned in The Names of the Minor Planets by Paul Herget in 1955.

Notes

References

External links 
 Asteroid Lightcurve Database (LCDB), query form (info )
 Dictionary of Minor Planet Names, Google books
 Asteroids and comets rotation curves, CdR – Observatoire de Genève, Raoul Behrend
 Discovery Circumstances: Numbered Minor Planets (1)-(5000) – Minor Planet Center
 
 

001323
Discoveries by Cyril Jackson (astronomer)
Named minor planets
001323
19340519